Foshan West railway station is a major railway station located in Nanhai District, Foshan, Guangdong, China. The station started construction on February 26, 2013 and was opened on August 18, 2017. The station serves as a gateway for conventional, regional and high-speed rail services for southwest Guangdong, serviced by the Nanning–Guangzhou and Guiyang–Guangzhou high speed railways.

In the future, this station will be served by Line 3 of the Foshan Metro.

See also
Foshan railway station

References 

Railway stations in China opened in 2017
Railway stations in Guangdong